Donbeh-ye Olya (also Romanized as Donbeh-ye ‘Olyā; also known as Donbeh-ye Bālā) is a village in Meymand Rural District, in the Central District of Shahr-e Babak County, Kerman Province, Iran. At the 2006 census, its population was 73, in 14 families.

References 

Populated places in Shahr-e Babak County